Dick Stockton and Rosemary Casals were the defending champions but lost in the semifinals to Phil Dent and Billie Jean King.

Phil Dent and Billie Jean King recovered from 2 match points at 4‐5, 15‐40 in the final set and won 3‐6, 6‐2, 7-5 in the final against Frew McMillan and Betty Stöve. The winning team split $6,500.

Seeds

Draw

Finals

Top half

Bottom half

References

External links
1976 US Open – Doubles draws and results at the International Tennis Federation

Mixed Doubles
US Open (tennis) by year – Mixed doubles